Xeritha is a genus of flies in the family Athericidae.

Species
Xeritha plaumanni Stuckenberg, 1966

References

Athericidae
Brachycera genera
Taxa named by Brian Roy Stuckenberg
Diptera of South America